Penina Moïse (23 April 1797, in Charleston, South Carolina – 13 September 1880, in Charleston, South Carolina) was an American poet.

Biography
Penina Moïse was one of nine children born to French parents of the Jewish faith, Abraham and Sarah Moise, who came to Charleston from the island of St. Eustatius in 1791 after fleeing a Black slave insurrection. Her father was an Alsatian-born merchant and her mother was born into a wealthy Sint Eustatius family. Her siblings were: Cherie, Aaron, Hyman, Benjamin (born in the islands), Rachel, Jacob, Abraham and Isaac, (born in the United States). She went to work at 12 to support her family when her father died. She studied on the side, developing her literacy and scholarship, and began her prolific writing career in 1830. She was the author of hymns used in Jewish religious services, contributed verses to the Home Journal, the Washington Union, and other publications, and published Fancy's Sketch-Book (Charleston, 1833), a book of poems, and Hymns Written for the Use of Hebrew Congregations (1856), a compilation for her synagogue, Beth Elohim.

Death
She died in Charleston, South Carolina on September 13, 1880, at the age of 83.  She is buried in Coming Street Cemetery, along with her mother and father and several of her siblings.

References

1797 births
1880 deaths
19th-century American poets
Burials at Coming Street Cemetery
Writers from Charleston, South Carolina
Jewish American poets
American people of French-Jewish descent
Jewish women writers
American women poets
19th-century American women writers
American women hymnwriters
19th-century American women musicians
Jewish Confederates
People of Sint Eustatius descent